Maryhill (Ward 15) is one of the 23 wards of Glasgow City Council. It was created in 2007 as Maryhill/Kelvin, and in that election it returned four council members, using the single transferable vote system. The same boundaries were used in 2012. For the 2017 Glasgow City Council election, the boundaries were changed, the ward substantially decreased in territory and population, was renamed Maryhill and returned three members.

Boundaries
Located in the far north of Glasgow with East Dunbartonshire to the north, the ward includes the former burgh of Maryhill (and the Wyndford housing estate) between the River Kelvin to the west and the Port Dundas branch of the Forth and Clyde Canal to the east, as well as the Maryhill Park, Summerston, Gilshochill, Acre and Dawsholm neighbourhoods to the north of the main canal.

The 2017 changes removed the Cadder neighbourhood which was assigned to Canal ward (along with a large area around Balmore Road which is almost uninhabited); part of North Kelvinside (streets to the north-west of Queen Margaret Drive, which now forms Maryhill's southern boundary) was added from the same ward. Kelvindale and Kelvinside were removed and assigned to a new Partick East/Kelvindale ward.

The ethnic makeup of the Maryhill ward using the 2011 census population statistics was:

91.2% White Scottish / British / Irish / Other
4.9% Asian (mainly Chinese)
3% Black (mainly African)
0.8% Mixed / Other Ethnic Group

Councillors

Election Results

2022 Election
2022 Glasgow City Council election

2017 Election
2017 Glasgow City Council election

2012 Election
2012 Glasgow City Council election

2007 Election
2007 Glasgow City Council election

See also
Wards of Glasgow

References

External links
Listed Buildings in Maryhill Ward, Glasgow City at British Listed Buildings

Wards of Glasgow
Maryhill